You Don't Have to Worry may refer to:

 "You Don't Have to Worry" (En Vogue song), 1990
 "You Don't Have to Worry" (Mary J. Blige song), 1993
 "You Don't Have to Worry" (New Edition song), 1996
 "You Don't Have to Worry", a song from the Tevin Campbell album Back to the World, 1996